Nye is a surname of Old English origin.
Notable people with the surname include:

 Aaron Nye (born 1978), Australian cricketer
 Andrea Nye (born 1939), American feminist philosopher and writer
 Archibald Nye (1895–1967), British Army lieutenant-general and Governor of Madras
 Ben Nye (1907–1986), American Hollywood makeup artist
 Benjamin Nye (born 1976), Notable Neurophysiologist and neurophysiology researcher
 Bill Nye (born 1955), "the Science Guy", American popular scientist and TV personality
 Blaine Nye (born 1946), American former National Football League player
 Carrie Nye (1936–2006), stage name of American actress Carolyn Nye McGeoy
 David Nye (disambiguation)
 Dick Nye (American sailor
 Edd Nye (born 1932), American politician
 Edgar Wilson Nye (1850–1896), American humorist
 Frank Nye (1852–1935), American politician
 Francis W. Nye (born 1918), U.S. Air Force major general
 G. Raymond Nye (1889–1965), American silent film actor
 George D. Nye (1898–1969), American politician
 Gerald Nye (1892–1971), U.S. Senator and political activist
 Gideon Nye (1812–1888), American diplomat, art collector, writer and merchant
 Glenn Nye (born 1974), American politician
 James W. Nye (1815–1876), U.S. Senator
 Jody Lynn Nye (born 1957), American science fiction author
 John Nye (scientist) (1923-2019), English physicist and glaciologist
 John Nye (cricketer) (1914–2002), English cricketer
 Joseph Nye (born 1937), American academic and political theorist
 Kim Nye (born 1961), New Zealand former footballer
 Lee Nye (1926–1999), American photographer
 Louis Nye (1913–2005), American actor and comedian
 Mark Nye (1909–1993), Anglican bishop and political prisoner in apartheid-era South Africa
 Mark Nye (politician) (born 1945), American politician
 Mary Jo Nye (born 1944), American historian of science and professor
 Myra Nye (1875—1955), American journalist and writer
 Naomi Shihab Nye (born 1952), Palestinian-American poet and songwriter
 Nelson C. Nye (1907–1997), American author, editor and reviewer of Western fiction
 Philip Nye (c. 1595–1672) was an English theologian and key adviser to Oliver Cromwell on matters of religion.
 Ray J. Nye (1871–1937), American politician
 Rich Nye (born 1944), American former Major League Baseball pitcher
 Robert Nye (1939–2016), British novelist, poet and playwright
 Russel B. Nye (1913–1993), American English professor, author and historian of popular culture
 Ruth Nye (born 1932), Australian pianist
 Simon Nye (born 1958), British comedy writer, creator of the sitcom Men Behaving Badly
 Stephen Nye (1648–1719), English clergyman and theological writer
 Steve Nye, music producer and keyboardist
 Susan Nye, Baroness Nye (born 1955), British civil servant
 Wallace G. Nye (1859–1926), 25th mayor of Minneapolis, Minnesota, United States
 William Nye (disambiguation)

References